Django Django are a British art rock band based in London, England. Formed in 2009, the band has released four studio albums starting with their self-titled debut in 2012. Their latest album Glowing in the Dark was released on 12 February 2021.

History

Formation
The quartet of David Maclean (drummer and producer), Vincent Neff (singer and guitarist), Jimmy Dixon (bassist) and Tommy Grace (synthesizer operator) met at Edinburgh College of Art, and formed Django Django in London in 2009.

David Maclean is the son of artist Marian Leven, brother of musician and director John Maclean and cousin of singer Lindsey Leven who performs with Guto Pryce in the band Gulp. Maclean and Grace are Scottish; Neff is originally from Northern Ireland while Dixon hails from Yorkshire.

"Our name has absolutely nothing to do with Django Reinhardt", wrote the band (nicknamed djangovideo in their account on YouTube) beneath the video post for their track WOR.

Django Django
Because Music released the band's self-titled debut album on 30 January 2012. The album featured already released singles "Waveforms" and "Default". The debut album reached number 33 on the UK album charts in the first week of release. It was then nominated for the 2012 Mercury Prize. Their song "Hail Bop" was featured in the football video game by EA Sports, FIFA 13 and "Waveforms" in Grand Theft Auto V. The album received considerable critical acclaim, and featured in the end-of-year lists of both Rolling Stone  and the NME. The band were surprised to achieve this success with Maclean commenting "I thought it would be an underground album that would sell a few hundred copies”.

Born Under Saturn
The band's second full length album, Born Under Saturn, was released on 4 May 2015.

Marble Skies 
The band's third full length album, Marble Skies, was released on 26 January 2018. Their song Tic Tac Toe also featured in the EA Sports soccer game, FIFA 18. On 12 October 2018 the band released the Winter's Beach EP.

Glowing in the Dark 
On 12 November 2020, the band announced their fourth studio album, Glowing in the Dark, would be released on 12 February 2021, and released the title track.

Discography

Studio albums

Remix albums

Singles

Other charting songs

References

External links
 

English psychedelic rock music groups
English indie rock groups
Musical groups from London
Musical groups established in 2009
2009 establishments in England
English art rock groups
Because Music artists
English electronic rock musical groups